The 1973 Rainier International Tennis Classic – Doubles was an event of the 1973 Rainier International Tennis Classic tennis tournament played at the Seattle Center Arena in Seattle, Washington in the United States between September 10 and September 16, 1973. Geoff Masters and Ross Case were the defending champions, but did not compete in this edition. Tom Gorman and Tom Okker won the doubles title, defeating Bob Carmichael and Frew McMillan in the final 7–5, 6–4.

Draw

References

External links
 ITF tournament edition details

Tennis
1973 Grand Prix (tennis)